Percival Ulysses "Perry" Cox, M.D., is a fictional character played by John C. McGinley on the American television comedy-drama Scrubs. Dr. Cox appeared in every episode except "My Last Words", "My Comedy Show", and "My Full Moon", all in Season 8.

John McGinley, Zach Braff and Donald Faison were the only cast members who returned as regulars for Season 9. Ken Jenkins, Sarah Chalke and Neil Flynn all made guest appearances.

Character profile
Cox is a sarcastic, cynical, misanthrope and has a quick, cruel wit, normally expressed through frequent and sometimes incredibly long rants. These rants were often handed to McGinley the night before, or on the day of recording. At the beginning of the series, he is the chief attending physician at Sacred Heart Hospital; he is later promoted to residency director and, by the eighth season, to chief of medicine. In the ninth and final season, he becomes a professor when Sacred Heart is turned into a medical school. He is the superior and unwilling mentor of the series' protagonist, John "J.D." Dorian (Zach Braff). He has a "married but not married" relationship with his equally acerbic ex-wife, Jordan Sullivan (Christa Miller), with whom he has a son, Jack, and a daughter, Jennifer Dylan. He treats virtually everyone in the hospital with derision, especially his longtime nemesis, Chief of Medicine Bob Kelso (Ken Jenkins).

Cox is athletic, often found playing basketball in the hospital's parking lot with younger employees. In "My Friend the Doctor", he shows off by slam-dunking a basketball, but injures his back when he lands, a reminder that he is middle-aged. Out of vanity, he tries to hide his injury. He is also extremely narcissistic and egocentric; when named by a magazine as the best doctor in the city, he lines up every staff member beneath him, and his ex-wife, to consecutively praise him, or risk a physical reprisal from the Janitor (Neil Flynn).
 
Ironically, while he goes out of his way to distance himself from others, Cox often gets mixed up in the lives of both his patients and those around him. This personal involvement often manifests in destructive ways, with Cox either internalizing his feelings or externalizing them by targeting those around him. Despite this, he has intervened in some situations, with no expectation of personal gain and often to his own detriment, to help others. A notable example is when he punches Kelso in the face in front of the entire staff when Kelso berates Elliot Reid (Sarah Chalke).

According to McGinley in the Season 1 DVD bonus features, Cox's habit of often touching his nose is a homage to Paul Newman's character in The Sting, although Cox also uses it as a sign of irritation on occasion, rather than just a sign signifying "it's going to be OK", as it was used in the film. Dr. Cox has also been compared to Gregory House. This is further explored in "My House", during which Cox acquires a temporary limp. At the end of the episode, through a series of circumstances, Cox walks into the room where the other characters are sitting and in a very House-esque way, gives them the answers to everything they have been trying to figure out through the whole episode.

Cox accepts the position of chief of medicine after Kelso retires. The position, however, does not come easily. He temporarily holds the position until the board finds a replacement, Dr. Taylor Maddox (Courteney Cox). After concluding that Maddox is, in fact, worse than Kelso, Cox teams up with the Janitor and Kelso to oust her. After Maddox is fired, the position is vacant until Kelso, behind Cox's back, recommends him for the job. Cox is initially hesitant to take the job out of fear of losing the connection he has with his patients. Although it takes a few days, Kelso convinces him to accept the position.

In the Season 2 DVD commentary of "His Story", series creator Bill Lawrence stated that one of Cox's quirks is that he knows if someone is standing behind him and who it is, without turning around to check. This quirk is defied in "My Finale" when J.D. stands behind Cox as he tells one of the new interns how he really feels; throughout the speech, he gives no sign that he knows that J.D. is behind him.

He is also a very good golfer, regularly besting Kelso.

Cox harbors an intense hatred for Hugh Jackman, mentioning him frequently in his rants about things he hates throughout the series. According to a 2006 interview with McGinley, Cox's reason for hating Jackman may be that Bill Lawrence envies the actor's talent.

Cox is occasionally seen wearing a Detroit Red Wings jersey. McGinley is a Red Wings fan and a close friend of former Detroit defenseman Chris Chelios, whose name can be seen on the back of Cox's jersey. He has also been seen wearing a T-shirt for Cheli's Chili Bar, a small chain of restaurants owned by Chelios.

Cox is a graduate of Hale University and Johns Hopkins School of Medicine, the former being a fictional adaptation of Yale University.

Cox is often seen drinking scotch and has acknowledged (humorously) that he has a drinking problem. Cox drinks so much that J.D. fears that Cox will die of liver disease. After making a mistake about a transplant patient that results in three deaths, a guilt-ridden Cox goes to work drunk and falls into a deep depression. J.D. eventually helps him forgive himself, however. His son Jack's first full sentence is "Daddy drinks a lot".

Relationships with other characters

In Sacred Heart
Cox constantly berates the residents, giving John "J.D." Dorian female nicknames (e.g. "Tiffany", "Jennifer", "Carol", "Betsy", "Lindsey") and regularly calling him "Newbie". He also calls Elliot Reid (Sarah Chalke) "Barbie", Turk (Donald Faison) "Gandhi" and Bob Kelso (Ken Jenkins) "Bob-O", "Bobcat", "Bobmeister", "Big Bob", and "Beelzebob". The one person he openly admits to tolerating is head nurse Carla Espinosa (Judy Reyes). Throughout Season 1, he and Turk compete for her affections, with Cox eventually bowing out when he sees that Turk and Carla are in love. In one episode, it is seen that Cox helped Turk with how to deal with women when they are mad, Turk eventually taking Perry's advice. Turk soon learns that Carla and Cox went on a date before Turk came to the hospital. 

Despite his contempt for Turk in early seasons, Cox develops a restrained level of respect for him, and even occasionally gets along with and relates to him. In the Season 6 episode, "My Road To Nowhere", when complications are found with his unborn child he insists that Turk assist with the surgery. Being reluctant at first, he even appoints Turk as the Chief Surgeon of Sacred Heart. Cox makes this decision after being told by Kelso that his own promotions by Kelso were against the latter's personal disdain for Cox, yet Cox's excellent medical knowledge made him the best candidate nonetheless - a feature that Turk shares with Cox.

He berates Elliot almost as much as J.D., frequently making fun of her insecurity, hairstyle and WASP background. However, he has also been known to stand up for her: he punches Kelso in the face when he yells at her in front of the staff.

Cox despises Kelso, Sacred Heart's chief of medicine. They disagree constantly about the best way to provide care, with Cox advocating for patients and Kelso adhering to the hospital's bottom line. At one point, he even punches Kelso in the face. On occasion, however, they have acknowledged the necessity of the other's position, and Kelso has admitted that they need each other. When Kelso retires and Cox succeeds him as chief of medicine, Cox confides in him about the pressures of the job, and the two form a "secret friendship".

While Cox has had limited interactions with veteran nurse Laverne Roberts (Aloma Wright), his cynicism drives him to mock her strong religious beliefs on occasion. This culminates in Cox confronting her about a seemingly "miraculous" accident, unwilling to accept it as divine intervention. Visibly upset, Laverne replies that after 24 years as a nurse, she has to believe in a "bigger plan" or she would lose all hope. Taken aback, Cox uncharacteristically apologizes and sincerely replies that he wishes he could also believe that. When she dies in the following episode, he joins the rest of the staff in bidding her farewell and drinking in her honor.

He berates J.D. from their first meeting and emphatically denies being his mentor, despite J.D.'s repeated attempts to win his favor. Nonetheless, Cox has shown concern for J.D.'s welfare, such as telling him not to blame himself for a patient's death and (reluctantly) comforting him when his father dies. He also tells J.D. that he trusts him as a doctor and a person and has taken an interest in him from the start because he seems "to actually give a crap". Cox also recommends him as a promising, skilled, and hard-working doctor to a review board. In "My Finale", Cox finally admits that he considers J.D. a talented doctor, a good person, and a friend, although he has to be tricked into it. He refuses to say this directly to J.D. or to hug him. A flash-forward scene at the end of the episode suggests that Cox will be a part of J.D.'s life well into the future (reluctantly, of course).

In the ninth season, Sacred Heart has become a medical school, and Cox is hired as a professor. He immediately begins berating the series' new protagonist, Lucy Bennett (Kerry Bishé), and takes an interest in one of his students, Drew Suffin (Michael Mosley). He calls the latter "Number 1" and makes him his protégé, much to J.D.'s chagrin. However, he still provides advice and support to J.D. (albeit in his usual sarcastic fashion) by telling him that he has to learn to let his students make their own mistakes.

Family life
Cox's family is from Pittsburgh. He has a sister, Paige (Cheryl Hines), who is a born-again Christian. Cox is presented as an ardent skeptic who says that he does not "technically believe" in God. His political views are varied; he has expressed disdain for members of both political parties, as well as "registered Independents". He opposes the Iraq War and is disgusted when Elliot reveals that she is a Republican. He also uses "Republican" as an insult for Paige.

Cox's father was an abusive alcoholic, and he later says that his mother did nothing to stop him when he "drunkenly knocked us from room to room". At the end of one episode, he admits to his sister that seeing her reminds him of the childhood he has tried so hard to forget.

Cox was apparently legally divorced from Jordan Sullivan (Christa Miller Lawrence), but the two have lived together in an exclusive relationship since Jordan discovered she was pregnant. The marriage appears to have started out strongly, but went downhill after Jordan cheated on him with Dr. Peter Fisher (Jay Mohr). They were originally to have divorced after their first child died in infancy, but this plot point was omitted because the network decided that it was too dark a twist in the story. Later in the series, it is revealed that Sacred Heart's incompetent lawyer Ted Buckland (Sam Lloyd) did not submit the divorce papers properly, so Cox and Jordan have been married during the entire run of the show. They immediately resume the role of husband and wife since they have already reconciled, but they quickly become dissatisfied with being an ordinary married couple, so they agree to go back to acting as though they were divorced, even going so far as to actually legally divorce, with Ted (again) ending their marriage. In later seasons, Cox quietly resumes wearing his wedding ring, and Jordan soon acquiesces to the marriage title after the birth of their second child, and it is implied that they have remarried.

He has two children with Jordan: a son named Jack and, after an unsuccessful vasectomy, a daughter named Jennifer Dylan (J.D.). Jack is played by Andrew Miller and his twin brother (although in a cameo appearance in "My Missed Perception", he is played by Bill Lawrence and Christa Miller's son, William). When Jordan first becomes pregnant with Jack, she tells Cox that she was impregnated by a Greek bellboy, wanting Cox to stay because he wants to rather than out of obligation to his child. At first, Cox feels nothing for the then-nameless boy, but begins to feel a connection after the child responds to the name Jack, which Cox had been trying to impress upon him for some time. J.D.'s college friend Spencer (Ryan Reynolds) accidentally tells Cox that he is actually Jack's biological father, and he takes on the role of father much more seriously. Cox has a very unorthodox way of raising Jack, often treating him like his "drinking buddy". Nonetheless, Cox loves his son and tries fervently to be a better father than his own was. He often talks to Jack in lieu of a therapist. He also dotes on his daughter; among other things, he goes far out of his way to have someone else give her a shot so that she will not associate him with pain.

Cox is best friends with Jordan's brother, Ben (Brendan Fraser), and is hit hard when he is diagnosed with leukemia; he is initially too afraid to treat him because he fears he will lose him. He rallies, however, and helps Ben go into remission. Ben dies in the episode "My Screw Up", but Cox convinces himself that he is still alive. When he finally admits that Ben is dead, he is devastated, and uncharacteristically allows people to comfort him at the funeral.

References

External links

Scrubs (TV series) characters
American male characters in television
Atheism in television
Fictional alcohol abusers
Fictional American physicians
Fictional atheists and agnostics
Fictional characters from Pittsburgh
Fictional Democrats (United States)
Fictional professors
Fictional victims of domestic abuse
Television characters introduced in 2001